Castile Run is a small tributary to South Fork Tenmile Creek in southwestern Pennsylvania.  The stream rises in northeastern Greene County and flows southeast entering South Fork Tenmile Creek at Chartiers, Pennsylvania. The watershed is roughly 25% agricultural, 69% forested and the rest is other uses.

Course
Castile Run rises at Castile, Pennsylvania, and then flows southeast to join South Fork Tenmile Creek at Chartiers.

Watershed
Castile Run drains  of area, receives about 40.6 in/year of precipitation, has a wetness index of 306.97 and is about 69% forested.

See also
List of rivers of Pennsylvania

References

Rivers of Pennsylvania
Tributaries of the Monongahela River
Rivers of Greene County, Pennsylvania